Jefferson Township is a township in Madison County, Iowa, in the United States.

History
Jefferson Township was established in 1858. It was named for President Thomas Jefferson.

References

Townships in Madison County, Iowa
Townships in Iowa
1858 establishments in Iowa